The 3rd FINA Synchronised Swimming World Cup was held 1987 in Cairo, Egypt. It featured swimmers from 10 nations, swimming in three events: Solo, Duet and Team.

Participating nations
10 nations swam at the 1987 Synchro World Cup:

Results

Point standings

References

FINA Synchronized Swimming World Cup
1987 in synchronized swimming
International aquatics competitions hosted by Egypt
1987 in Egyptian sport
Synchronised swimming in Egypt